Chlorhoda amabilis is a moth of the subfamily Arctiinae first described by William Schaus in 1915. It is found in Brazil.

References

Arctiini